Night of the Ripper is a 1984 novel written by American writer Robert Bloch.

Plot
The story is set during the reign of Queen Victoria and follows the investigation of Inspector Abberline in attempting to apprehend Jack the Ripper and includes some characters based on real-life Victorians such as Sir Arthur Conan Doyle in the storyline.

References

1984 American novels
Historical novels
American crime novels
Doubleday (publisher) books
Novels by Robert Bloch
Novels about Jack the Ripper